Dwight L. Hafeli (September 1, 1912 – July 17, 1983) was an American football and basketball player and coach. Hafeli was named AP honorable mention All-American end in 1936. He was selected by the Chicago Cardinals in the 1937 NFL Draft. He served as the head football coach and basketball coach at Kenyon College in Ohio.  Hafeli was also the head basketball coach at the Missouri School of Mines and Metallurgy—now known as Missouri University of Science and Technology—from 1942 to 1949.

Head coaching record

Football

References

External links
 

1912 births
1983 deaths
American football ends
Basketball coaches from Illinois
Kenyon Lords football coaches
Kenyon Lords basketball coaches
Missouri S&T Miners men's basketball coaches
Players of American football from Illinois
Washington University Bears football players